The Ambassador of the Italian Republic to the United States of America is the official representative of the government of Italy to the government of the United States. Prior to the formation of the Italian Republic in 1946, the Kingdom of Italy was represented in the United States by ambassadors or envoys extraordinary and ministers plenipotentiary.

List of heads of mission 
Listed are the heads of the Italian diplomatic delegation to the United States, with their titles and dates of their presentation of credentials.

Representatives of the Kingdom of Italy

Ambassadors of the Italian Republic

See also 

 Italy–United States relations
List of diplomatic missions in the United States
Ministry of Foreign Affairs (Italy)
List of ambassadors of the United States to Italy
Foreign relations of Italy

References 

Ambassadors of Italy to the United States
United States
Italy